Sovetskoye is a rural locality (a selo) in Choyskoye Rural Settlement of Choysky District, the Altai Republic, Russia. The population was 116 as of 2016.

Geography 
Sovetskoye is located east from Gorno-Altaysk, in the valley of the Isha River, 8 km northeast of Choya (the district's administrative centre) by road. Choya is the nearest rural locality.

References 

Rural localities in Choysky District